Tucker Inlet is an Antarctic ice-filled inlet indenting the coast of Victoria Land between Capes Wheatstone and Daniell. It was discovered in February 1841 by Sir James Clark Ross who named this feature for Charles T. Tucker, master of the Erebus.

Inlets of Antarctica
Landforms of Victoria Land
Borchgrevink Coast